Ginés de Mafra (1493–1546) was a Portuguese or Spanish explorer who sailed to the Philippines in the 16th century. Mafra was a member of the expeditions of Fernão de Magalhães of 1519–1521 and Ruy López de Villalobos of 1542–1545.

History

Voyage to the Philippine Islands 

Mafra was born in the town of Mafra, north of Lisbon, Portugal, or, according to other sources, in the town of Jérez de la Frontera, in Cadiz, Andalusia. In 1519, he became a crew member of the Magellan expedition. Mafra started as a seaman in the galleon Trinidad, the armada's flagship, and was on board when the Portuguese captured the Spanish vessel at Benaconora, today Jailolo, in the Moluccas. He was imprisoned for 5 months at Ternate (20 km south of Benaconora) and transferred to a jail at Banda Islands where he remained for 4 months. Thereafter, he was transferred to Malacca for 5 months after what he was brought to Cochin, India, where he languished for two years. Mafra was finally brought by the Portuguese to Lisbon together with his crew members including Gonzalo Gómez de Espinosa and Hans Bergen. Upon their arrival in Portugal in 1526, Mafra and his crew members were thrown in prison. Bergen died in jail while Espinosa was later released that year. Mafra himself was detained due to his possession of important documents which included the books and papers from the Trinidad. The manuscripts included navigational notes of Andrés de San Martín, who was the fleet's chief pilot and astrologer. It was later taken and mined by Portuguese historians. These manuscripts were later transferred to Spain during the Iberian Union in 1580-1640. The letters were accessed by several Spanish chroniclers, including Antonio de Herrera y Tordesillas. These papers have been lost and now exist only in quotes, references, and citations by these historians.

Finally freed only to find his wife had remarried 
After numerous pleas by Mafra to the Holy Roman Emperor, Charles V of Spain to have him released, he was freed in early 1527, and immediately proceeded to Spain. He was given an audience with the emperor after which he went straight to Palos only to discover his wife, Catalina Martínez del Mercado, believing he had died during the voyage, had remarried, and sold their personal fortunes, and land properties. Mafra wrote to the emperor complaining of his marital trouble, and asking for his intercession for the return of his possessions. The emperor agreed, and ordered an investigation be made by officials, and to have the matter resolved.

Expedition to the New World 
Mafra goes back to the sea in 1531, and sails to Central, and South America. The governor of Guatemala, Pedro de Alvarado, in a letter written on November 20, 1536, tells the emperor he had hired the services of Mafra as pilot, who is considered as one of the best sailors due to his experiences with the Magellan voyage. It's not clear where the expedition went but most scholars believe the fleet went to Peru.

Villalobos expedition (1542–1546)

Thus it is a mystery that many scholars have been trying to solve, when we find him as one of the men of the galley  who made it to the port of Mazaua in 1543. The galleon was separated from the fleet during a severe storm as the ships sailed between Eniwetok and Ulithi. While stranded in one of those islands, he wrote an account of the Magellan voyage and discussed meeting Rajah Siaiu, chieftain of Mazaua. Mafra wrote, "This same chief [Rajah Siaiu] we saw in the year 1543 by those of us in the fleet of general Ruy López de Villalobos, and he still remembered Magellan, and displayed to us some of the things he [Magellan] had given him." According to Italian historian Antonio Pigafetta, "Magellan's gift consisted of a garment of red and yellow cloth made in the Turkish fashion, a red cap, knives, and mirrors". Mafra and his crew members stayed in the island for about 5–6 months. Mafra was one of 117 survivors of the failed expedition, making it to Malacca. There Mafra, age 53, elected to stay together with 29 other crew members. The other survivors sailed for Lisbon in a Portuguese ship. Mafra handed his manuscript to an unnamed sailor. This eventually reached Spain after having been transcribed by an unknown editor, where it remained hidden for many centuries in Madrid's Archive of the Indies. It was eventually rediscovered and published in 1920.

Geographical mysteries
Mafra's document has been examined by American geographer Donald D. Brand. Brand dismissed it as nothing more than what Mafra recalled on Andrés de San Martín writings, which Mafra had with him until these were confiscated in Lisbon. "It should be pointed out here that the previously unknown, Descripción de los reinos, Libro que trata del descubrimiento y principio del estrecho que se llama de Magallanes, por Ginés de Mafra, published in Madrid, 1920 in Tres Relaciones could not be based on more than Mafra's memory of what he might have read in a Tratado begun by San Martín." This dismissive charge unargued, and unproved, was echoed by Martín Torodash, and Philippine religious historian John N. Schumacher, and influenced the thinking of many other scholars including the ethnographer historian William H. Scott. This explains why the unsolved information to the geographical mystery of Mazaua has remained buried in his record. Laurence Bergreen gave due recognition of Mafra's document in Bergreen's 2003 work titled Over the Edge of the World, Magellan's Terrifying Circumnavigation of the Globe. It is this document that makes his information an incomparably important geographical testimony that unlocks the mystery of the island of Mazaua.

Mafra wrote that Magellan's port was an isle with a circumference of 3-4 leagues or 9-12 nautical miles. "Y otro dia luego partió  [Magallanes]  de esta isla, y navegando su viage llego a otra isla que tendra de circuito de tres hasta cuatro leguas". ("And after another day he [Magellan] left this island [Homonhon], and sailing on his way arrived at another [Mazaua] three or four leagues in circumference.") Because the shape of the isle is almost circular, 3-4 leagues translate to an area of from 2,214 up to 3,930 hectares. In contrast, Limasawa is only 698 hectares. He also stated, they anchored west of the isle: "Esta isla tiene un puerto bueno a la parte del poniente della, y es poblada." ("This island called Mazaua has a good harbor on its western side, and is inhabited"). Mazaua is officially, by Philippine law, declared as the island of Limasawa, an isle without anchorage, and the port is located east of the island. The land area starts from present day Surigao, and extends all the way to Zamboanga del Norte. Mafra writes in Spanish: "De este Señor de Maçagua" [Rajah Siaiu] "supo Magallanes que en una provincia que se llamaba Butuan que es en la isla de Mindanao que es de la parte del norte della quince leguas de Maçagua habia gran cantidad de oro." ("From the chief of Mazaua" Rajah Siaiu "Magellan learned that a province called Butuan, on the island of Mindanao, which is somewhere fifteen leagues to the north of Mazaua, possessed a large quantity of gold.") This puts the port of Mazaua at 9° N, the exact latitude for it by the Genoese Pilot, one of those who wrote an eyewitness document. All these information revolutionize geographical conception of Mazaua. Limasawa, which has been affirmed thrice by the Philippines' National Historical Institute, to be Mazaua is rectangular in shape, 698 hectares in area, and is reached by a track that is not drawn by any of the document. What is most telling is that Limasawa has no anchorage, As stated by the coast pilot, "Limasawa is fringed by a narrow, steep-to reef, off which the depths are too great to afford anchorage for large vessels."

The mysterious isle
Armed with the insight from Mafra's information, a team of archaeologists led by a geomorphologist went to work to validate the theory Mazaua is in 9°N. In January 2001, an incredible discovery met the earth scientists: the geo-political entities composed of Pinamanculan and Bancasi inside Butuan in northern Mindanao was in fact an island. From that point on the archaeologists went to work to find artefacts that would identify the isle as the port of Magellan. Age of contact ceramics, disarticulated human bones have been found that show the isle was inhabited before the Spanish arrival. Corroded iron, metal bracelets, and a brass pestle have been dug up that however have yet to be dated. The excavation was done in places outside the suspected village where the indigenous tribes of Mazaua had lived.

However scientists have not yet examined the entire isle including its coastal regions. At the moment no authenticated physical evidence traceable to Magellan and Mafra and other known European visitors who visited the island-port has been found. As of today, geologists and archaeologists are still digging and investigating the site.

Publications
Bergreen, Laurence. Over the Edge of the World, Magellan's Terrifying Circumnavigation of the Globe. HarperCollins: New York, 2003.
Combés, Francisco. Historia de las islas de Mindanao, Iolo y sus adyacentes. W.E. Retana (ed.): Madrid, 1897.
Defense Mapping Agency. Pub. 162 Sailing Directions (Enroute). Philippine Islands 3. Washington D.C., 1993.
de Jesus, Vicente C. (2002). Mazaua Historiography. Retrieved February 27, 2007.
Escalante Alvarado, Garcia de. 1546. Colección de documentos inéditos relativos al descubrimiento, conquesta y organización de las Antiguas posesiones españolas en América y Oceania (42 v., Madrid, 1864-1884), tomo v, pp. 117-209.
Herrera, Antonio de. Historia general de los hechos de los Castellanos en las islas y tierrafirme del mar oceano, t. VI. Angel Gonzalez Palencia 9ed.): Madrid, 1947.
Howgego, Ramond John. 2002. Encyclopedia of Exploration. Sydney: Hordern House.
Joyner, Tim. Magellan. International Marine: Maine, 1992.
Mafra, Ginés de. Libro que trata del descubrimiento y principio del estrecho que se llama de Magallanes. National Library Museum; ed. by A. Blázquez and D. Aguilera: Madrid, 1920.
Medina, José Toribio. El Descubrimiento del Océano Pacífico: Vasco Nuñez Balboa, Hernando de Magallanes y Sus Compañeros. Imprenta Universitaria: Chile, 1920.
Morison, Samuel Eliot. The European Discovery of America, The Southern Voyages 1492-1616. Oxford University Press: New York, 1974.
Noone, Martin J. The Discovery and Conquest of the Philippines 1521-1581. Richview Browne & Nolan Limited: Ireland, 1983.
Ramusio, Gian Battista. "La Detta navigatione per messer Antonio Pigafetta Vicentino". In: Delle navigatione... Venice: Pp. 380-98.
Rebelo, Gabriel. 1561. Historia das ilhas de Maluco. In: Documentação para a História das Missões do Padroado Português do Oriente: Insulíndia. Lisboã: Agencia Geral do Ultramar. 1955. Cited by José Manuel Garcia in As Filipinas na historiografía portuguesa do século XVI, Centro Portugués de Estudos do Sudeste Asiático, Porto: 2003.
Santisteban, Fray Geronimo de. 1546. Colección de documentos inéditos relativos al descubrimiento, conquesta y organización de las Antiguas posesiones españolas en América y Oceania (42 v., Madrid, 1864-1884), tomo v., pp. 151-165.
Schumacher, John N. "The First Mass in the Philippines". In: Kasaysayn 6: National Historical Institute: Manila, 1981.
Torodash, Martin. "Magellan Historiography" In: Hispanic American Historical Review'', LI (May 1971), 313-335.

External links
Google books - Magellan's Voyage

1493 births
1546 deaths
16th-century geographers
16th-century Spanish people
Explorers of Asia
Magellan expedition
People of Spanish colonial Philippines
Portuguese explorers of the Pacific
Spanish explorers of the Pacific
People from Mafra, Portugal